Walter Turczyk (26 December 1909 – 19 October 1976) was a Polish athlete. He competed in the men's javelin throw at the 1936 Summer Olympics.

References

External links
 

1909 births
1976 deaths
Athletes (track and field) at the 1936 Summer Olympics
Polish male javelin throwers
Olympic athletes of Poland
People from Siemianowice Śląskie
Polish emigrants to Germany